In enzymology, a hydroxyquinol 1,2-dioxygenase is an enzyme that catalyzes the chemical reaction

benzene-1,2,4-triol + O2  3-hydroxy-cis,cis-muconate

Thus, the two substrates of this enzyme are benzene-1,2,4-triol (hydroxyquinol) and O2, whereas its product is 3-hydroxy-cis,cis-muconate.

This enzyme belongs to the family of oxidoreductases, specifically those acting on single donors with O2 as oxidant and incorporation of two atoms of oxygen into the substrate (oxygenases). The oxygen incorporated need not be derived from O2.  The systematic name of this enzyme class is benzene-1,2,4-triol:oxygen 1,2-oxidoreductase (decyclizing). This enzyme is also called hydroxyquinol dioxygenase.  This enzyme participates in benzoate degradation via hydroxylation and 1,4-dichlorobenzene degradation.  It employs one cofactor, iron.

Structural studies 

, only one structure has been solved for this class of enzymes, with the PDB accession code .

References 

 

EC 1.13.11
Iron enzymes
Enzymes of known structure
Natural phenols metabolism